Obrež (Serbian Cyrillic: Обреж) is a village in Serbia. It is situated in the Varvarin municipality, in the Rasina District. The village has a Serb ethnic majority and its population numbering 3,879 people (2002 census).

See also
List of places in Serbia

Populated places in Rasina District